Phyllocharis is a genus of leaf beetle belonging to the family Chrysomelidae.

Species
 Phyllocharis acroleuca Baly, 1862 
 Phyllocharis biceps Lea, 1903 
 Phyllocharis blackburni (Jacoby, 1898) 
 Phyllocharis cyanicornis (Fabricius, 1801) 
 Phyllocharis cyanipes (Fabricius, 1775) 
 Phyllocharis ewani Reid, 2006 
 Phyllocharis eximia Baly, 1878 
 Phyllocharis flexuosa Baly, 1855 
 Phyllocharis gracilis Jacoby, 1898 
 Phyllocharis hieroglyphica Lea, 1903 
 Phyllocharis hilaris Lea, 1903 
 Phyllocharis ianthinipennis Lea, 1903 
 Phyllocharis impressicollis Jacoby, 1885 
 Phyllocharis jansoni Baly, 1878 
 Phyllocharis leoparda Baly, 1855 
 Phyllocharis marmorata Lea, 1903 
 Phyllocharis melanospila Baly, 1862 
 Phyllocharis nigricornis (Fabricius, 1775) 
 Phyllocharis ornata Baly, 1862 
 Phyllocharis proxima Weise, 1923 
 Phyllocharis sculpticeps Lea, 1915 
 Phyllocharis sinuata (Olivier, 1807) 
 Phyllocharis undulata (Linnaeus, 1753) 
 Phyllocharis wollumbina (Daccordi, 2003)

References

Chrysomelinae
Chrysomelidae genera